Marpole Loop is a public transit exchange in Vancouver, British Columbia, Canada. The exchange is a  part of Metro Vancouver's TransLink transit network. It is the southernmost transit exchange located within the city of Vancouver.

History
Marpole Loop originally opened on July 4, 1905 as an interurban station on the BCER Lulu Island line. Interurban services continued to  operate until February 28, 1958, coinciding with the completion of the "Rails-to-Rubber" transition.

As of September 7, 2009, suburban routes that served Marpole Loop from Delta, Richmond, Surrey and White Rock, were rerouted to terminate at Bridgeport station on SkyTrain's Canada Line.

In mid-2019, TransLink installed a charging station at the loop for its battery-electric bus pilot project. Revenue operation for the charging station began on September 11, 2019.

Location
Located on Southwest Marine Drive at the northern foot of the Arthur Laing Bridge, which connects Vancouver to Richmond and Vancouver International Airport. Part of the exchange is located on Marine Drive itself, and part of it is located in an area separated from regular traffic. Because of this arrangement, the loop covers a large area; TransLink maps sometimes designate the loop as "Hudson" to avoid confusion.

The loop is located next to the Vancouver Transit Centre, which replaced the Oakridge Transit Centre in September 2006. The transit depot houses the city of Vancouver's public transit fleet. Marpole Loop can accommodate trolley buses, regular length diesel buses and articulated buses.

Routes

As of October 2020, Marpole Loop was served by the following routes:

References

External links

TransLink (British Columbia) bus stations
1905 establishments in British Columbia